Dailekh, locally known as Dailekh Bazar. Narayan is a town and the headquarters of Dailekh District located in Karnali Province of Nepal. It was Incorporated to Narayan Municipality on 26 March 1997.

Populated places in Dailekh District